Marai, Márai may refer to the following people:

Given name
Marai Al-Awaji (born 1973), Saudi football referee

Surname
Carmen Marai, Chilean poet and novelist
Montaser Marai, Palestinian-Jordanian journalist and documentary filmmaker
Mpitsa Marai (born 1980), Mosotho footballer 
Sándor Márai (1900–1989), Hungarian writer and journalist

See also
Marei (name)
 Marais (given name)
 Marais (surname)